This is a list of mosques in the United Arab Emirates, in the eastern part of the Arabian Peninsula.

See also
 Islam in the United Arab Emirates
 Lists of mosques

References

External links

General Authority of Islamic Affairs & Endowments
Mosques in Dubai

 
United Arab Emirates
Mosques